Birmingham Museum may refer to:

 Birmingham Museum and Art Gallery, museum and art gallery in Birmingham, England
 Birmingham Museum of Art, in Birmingham, Alabama, U.S.
 Birmingham Railway Museum, former name of the Tyseley Locomotive Works
 Thinktank, Birmingham Science Museum, science museum in Birmingham, England

See also
 Birmingham Museum Collection Centre, storage facility for the Birmingham Museums Trust
 Birmingham Museums Trust, runs nine museum sites in Birmingham, England